Michael George Ripper (27 January 1913 –  28 June 2000) was an English character actor.

He began his film career in quota quickies in the 1930s and until the late 1950s was virtually unknown; he was seldom credited. Along with Michael Gough he played one of the two murderers in Laurence Olivier's film version of Richard III (1955). Ripper became a mainstay in Hammer Film Productions playing supporting character roles: coachmen, peasants, tavern keepers, pirates and sidekicks. Appearing in more of the company's films than any other performer, these included The Camp on Blood Island (1958), The Revenge of Frankenstein (1958), The Mummy (1959), The Brides of Dracula (1960), Captain Clegg (1962), The Scarlet Blade (1963), The Reptile (1966), The Plague of the Zombies (1966) and The Mummy's Shroud (1967). 

Some of his parts were little better than glorified bits (as in The Curse of the Werewolf), but his penultimate role for Hammer Films was a significant supporting part as a landlord in Scars of Dracula in 1970. (His last Hammer role was as a railway worker in the atypical comedy That's Your Funeral two years later.)

He is also well remembered for his role as a jockey/horse trainer in The Belles of St. Trinian's and the liftman in the next three of the St. Trinian's comedies, and on television for his role as Thomas the chauffeur in the BBC comedy Butterflies (1978–83) and as Burke, one of the two criminals in the youth television series Freewheelers (1968–71). His other TV roles include Mr Shepherd, Aunt Sally's owner, in Worzel Gummidge, a judge in "Voice in The Night", a 1958 episode of The Adventures of William Tell, Phunkey in The Pickwick Papers (1985) and the Drones Porter in Jeeves and Wooster (1990–91). Michael also starred in George and Mildred, Series 1 Episode 5, Your Money or Your Life, as George's Uncle Fred.

Partial filmography

 Twice Branded (1936) – Minor role (uncredited)
 Prison Breaker (1936) – (uncredited)
 Not So Dusty (1936) – Bit Role (uncredited)
 To Catch a Thief (1936) – (uncredited)
 The Heirloom Mystery (1936)
 Nothing Like Publicity (1936) – (uncredited)
 Pearls Bring Tears (1937) – (uncredited)
 Busman's Holiday (1937) – Crook
 Farewell to Cinderella (1937) – Undetermined Role (uncredited)
 Strange Adventures of Mr. Smith (1937) – Undetermined Role (uncredited)
 Fifty-Shilling Boxer (1937) – (uncredited)
 Father Steps Out (1937) – Minor Role (uncredited)
 Why Pick on Me? (1937) – (uncredited)
 Easy Riches (1938) – Cuthbert
 Paid in Error (1938) – Minor Role (uncredited)
 His Lordship Regrets (1938) – (uncredited)
 You're the Doctor (1938) – (uncredited)
 His Lordship Goes to Press (1938) – (uncredited)
 Luck of the Navy (1938)
 Miracles Do Happen (1938) – Morning Comet Reporter (uncredited)
 Blind Folly (1939) – (uncredited)
 Captain Boycott (1947) – Pat Nolan
 Oliver Twist (1948) – Barney
 The Dark Road (1948) – Andy Anderson
 Noose (1948) – Nelson (uncredited)
 The History of Mr. Polly (1949) – Third Store Employee Carrying Packages (uncredited)
 The Rocking Horse Winner (1949) – 2nd Chauffeur (uncredited)
 The Adventures of PC 49 Investigating the Case of the Guardian Angel (1949) – Fingers
 Your Witness (1950) – Samuel 'Sam' Baxter
 Let's Have a Murder (1950) 
 A Case for PC 49 (1951) – George Steele
 Lady Godiva Rides Again (1951) – Joe (stage manager)
 Old Mother Riley's Jungle Treasure (1951) – Jake
 Secret People (1952) – Charlie
 Treasure Hunt (1952) – Removal Man (uncredited)
 Derby Day (1952) – 1st Newspaper Reporter (uncredited)
 Folly to Be Wise (1952) – Drill Corporal
 Alf's Baby (1953) – Mike
 The Story of Gilbert and Sullivan (1953) – Louis
 Appointment in London (1953) – Bomb Aimer
 Blood Orange (1953) – Eddie
 The Intruder (1953) – Mechanic
 Personal Affair (1953) – Reporter (uncredited)
 The Rainbow Jacket (1954) – Benny Loder
 The Belles of St. Trinian's (1954) – Albert Faning
 The Sea Shall Not Have Them (1954) – Botterhill
 Tale of Three Women (1954) – Simkins (segment "Thief of London' story)
 The Constant Husband (1955) – Left Luggage Attendant
 Geordie (1955) – Reporter
 Secret Venture (1955) – Bill Rymer
 Richard III (1955) – Forrest, 2nd murderer
 1984 (1956) – Outer Party Orator
 Yield to the Night (1956) – Roy, bar good-timer
 Reach for the Sky (1956) – Warrant Officer West
 The Green Man (1956) – Waiter
 X the Unknown (1956) – Sgt. Harry Grimsdyke
 The Steel Bayonet (1957) – Pvt. Middleditch
 Quatermass 2 (1957) – Ernie
 Woman in a Dressing Gown (1957) – Pawnbroker
 These Dangerous Years (1957) – Pvt. Simpson
 Not Wanted on Voyage (1957) – Steward Macy
 The One That Got Away (1957) – J.E. Freeman – Greengrocer (uncredited)
 The Naked Truth (1957) – J.E. Freeman – Greengrocer (uncredited)
 Blue Murder at St Trinian's (1957) – Eric – The Liftman
 The Camp on Blood Island (1958) – Japanese Driver
 Up the Creek (1958) – Decorator
 The Revenge of Frankenstein (1958) – Kurt
 Girls at Sea (1958) – Jumper, Marine
 Further Up the Creek (1958) – Ticket Collector
 I Only Arsked! (1958) – Azim
 Quatermass and the Pit (TV, 1959) – Sergeant
 The Man Who Could Cheat Death (1959) – Morgue Attendant (uncredited)
 Bobbikins (1959) – Naval Petty Officer (uncredited)
 The Mummy (1959) – Poacher
 The Ugly Duckling (1959) – Benny
 Jackpot (1960) – Lenny Lane
 Sink the Bismarck! (1960) – Able Seaman, Lookout 'Suffolk' (uncredited)
 Dead Lucky (1960) – Percy Simpson
 The Brides of Dracula (1960) – Coachman
 Not a Hope in Hell (1960) – Sid
 A Circle of Deception (1960) – Monsieur Chauvel
 The Pure Hell of St Trinian's (1960) – Liftman
 The Curse of the Werewolf (1961) – Old Soak
 A Matter of WHO (1961) – Skipper
 Petticoat Pirates (1961) – Tug
 The Pirates of Blood River (1962) – Mack, a pirate
 Captain Clegg (1962) – Jeremiah Mipps (coffinmaker)
 The Phantom of the Opera (1962) – Longfaced Cabbie
 Out of the Fog (1962) – Tich
 A Prize of Arms (1962) – Cpl. Freeman
 The Amorous Prawn (1962) – Angus
 Two Left Feet (1963) – Uncle Reg
 The Punch and Judy Man (1963) – Waiter
 What a Crazy World (1963) – The Common Man
 Swallows and Amazons (1963) – Old Billie
 The Scarlet Blade (1963) – Pablo
 The Devil-Ship Pirates (1964) – Pepe, a pirate
 Every Day's a Holiday (1964) – Mr. George Pullman
 The Curse of the Mummy's Tomb (1964) – Achmed
 The Secret of Blood Island (1964) – Lt Tojoko
 The Spy Who Came in from the Cold (1965) – Lofthouse (uncredited)
 The Plague of the Zombies (1966) – Sergeant Jack Swift
 Rasputin the Mad Monk (1966) – Waggoner (voice, uncredited)
 The Reptile (1966) – Tom Bailey
 The Great St Trinian's Train Robbery (1966) –  The Liftman
 Where the Bullets Fly (1966) – Angel
 The Deadly Bees (1966) – David Hawkins
 The Mummy's Shroud (1967) – Longbarrow
 Torture Garden (1967) – Gordon Roberts (Framework Story)
 Inspector Clouseau (1968) – Steven Frey
 The Lost Continent (1968) – Sea Lawyer
 Dracula Has Risen from the Grave (1968) – Max
 Journey into Darkness (1968) – Albert Cole (episode 'Paper Dolls')
 Moon Zero Two (1969) – 1st Card Player
 Mumsy, Nanny, Sonny and Girly (1970) – Zoo attendant
 Taste the Blood of Dracula (1970) – Cobb
 Scars of Dracula (1970) – Landlord
 That's Your Funeral (1972) – Arthur (Railway Porter)
 The Creeping Flesh (1973) – Carter
 No Sex Please, We're British (1973) – Traffic Warden
 Legend of the Werewolf (1975) – Sewerman
 Unipart TV advert (1970s) : ' Thousands of Parts for Millions of Cars ' , with Peter Cleall 
 The Sweeney (TV 1975) Herbie Mew. 
 The Prince and the Pauper (1977) – Edith's Servant
 Sammy's Super T-Shirt (1978) – Gateman
 Danger on Dartmoor (1980)
 No Surrender (1985) – Tony Bonaparte
 Revenge of Billy the Kid'' (1992) – Local Pub Old (final film role)

References

External links
 

1913 births
2000 deaths
English male film actors
English male television actors
Male actors from Portsmouth
20th-century English male actors
Alumni of the Royal Central School of Speech and Drama